Grubman is a surname. Notable people with the surname include:

Allen Grubman, American entertainment lawyer
Jack Grubman (born 1954), American businessman
Lizzie Grubman (born 1971), American publicist